Cooper is an unincorporated community in Wayne County, Kentucky, United States.

John Willis Hurst (1920–2011), physician, was born in Cooper.

Notes

Unincorporated communities in Wayne County, Kentucky
Unincorporated communities in Kentucky